Bhujangayyana Dashavathara is a 1988 Indian Kannada-language political drama film directed and produced by Lokesh, based on the novel of the same name by Srikrishna Alanahalli. Besides Lokesh as the protagonist, the film stars Pallavi Joshi and Girija Lokesh.

The film opened on 4 January 1991 and won numerous awards including the Best Film in Karnataka State Film Awards, best story and best supporting actor. At the Filmfare Awards South, the film won the best director award to Lokesh. However, the film performed poorly at the box office and incurred huge financial losses for Lokesh.

Cast
 Lokesh as Bhujangayya
 Pallavi Joshi
 Girija Lokesh
 Vadiraj
 Krishne Gowda
 Chandre Gowda
 Brahmavar
 G. V. Sharadha
 Prema
 Master Srujan
 Master Balaraj

Soundtrack

The music of the film was composed by Hamsalekha.

Awards and honors
 1990-91: Karnataka State Film Awards
 Third Best Film
 Best Supporting Actress - Girija Lokesh
 Best Story - Srikrishna Alanahalli

 1991 : Filmfare Awards South
 Filmfare Award for Best Director - Kannada : Lokesh

References

1991 films
1990s Kannada-language films
Films based on Indian novels
Films scored by Hamsalekha